"Insatiable" is the 10th episode of the third season of the SyFy television series Warehouse 13. It originally aired on September 19, 2011.

Plot
In the forests of Ithaca, a young couple is attacked by an unseen creature. While at the hospital, Pete and Myka discover that the bite marks are human. Returning to the forest, they stumble upon Kevin Monroe eating a deer. Kevin appears zombie-like: his face is pale blue, and he is shivering. They take Kevin to the hospital.

Pete and Myka investigate Kevin's house, where they find his son and take him to the hospital where his dad is. While Artie cares for the boy, Pete and Myka follow-up on a police call about an individual eating a squirrel reported as having the same symptoms as Kevin. Pete is bitten while apprehending this person, but Myka starts showing signs; she begins to shiver.

Pete theorizes that the people are zombies, and Artie learns from Kevin's son that the artifact responsible is from a taco truck both victims visited. When they arrive at the taco truck, they are attacked by zombies. Myka turns on Pete; he enters the taco truck and sees a tip jar. Pete realizes that this is the artifact causing the problems: the tip jar is from the Donner Party's ill-fated journey. He destroys the tip jar, neutralizing its effect.

Meanwhile, Claudia is offered a role in a band by the guitarist Dwayne Maddox. Claudia is also told that "death comes for you this night" by Sallah, the Soothsaying Sultan, a fortune-telling booth, and an additional artifact. That night, a statue nearly falls on her, among other misfortunes.

Claudia fails to end the accidents and is nearly drowned by the "Eau de Vie Faucet." She is rescued by Leena, who explains that the fortune-telling booth artifact works by overwhelming the user with dread, so if Claudia ignores it, she will be fine. Claudia accepts the offer from Dwayne to join the band, and they embrace.

The episode concludes with Steve Jinks in a bar, unable to pay his tab because Mrs. Fredric has cut his credit. Marcus Diamond approaches Steve with the offer to pay his bill, asking that Steve join his panel against the Warehouse. Steve accepts the offer and is impressed when Marcus jumps off a building. Mrs. Fredric is seen smiling in satisfaction.

Cultural references
 Claudia plays "Cherry Bomb" by The Runaways. She would play the song again with Cherie Currie in the Season 4 episode "Runaway."
 Artie references the movie Animal House, which chronicles the adventures of a bunch of frat boys who spend most of their time partying and playing pranks on authority figures.
 Pete references This Is Spinal Tap, when stating, "I'm gonna crank this baby up to 11."
 The episode makes many references to popular culture zombie movies, most notably Dawn of the Dead.

Artifacts and jokes

Critical reception
The episode received mixed reviews. IGN gave it the highest rating of 9/10, commenting on the "pitch-perfect plots." They also praised Saul Rubinek and Allison Scagliotti for their performances. Io9 described it as "a fun 'artifact of the week' episode". tvfanatic.com gave the episode a negative review saying the zombie plot was "pretty bland" and that "some character actions simply didn't make sense". However, they did find the Claudia plot the highlight of the episode and described her "inability to let go of her BFFE" as wonderful. thevoiceoftv.com complained that they were jumping on the bandwagon of this year's zombie movies and were unamused by the "lame zombie joke." They also disliked the plot and found the twists predictable. The only positive they found was in Artie's interaction with the young boy. craveonline.com found it a disappointing episode saying that "the show needs to be better than this." They were critical of the plots, finding them flawed and the resolution lackluster. However, they enjoyed Artie's use of artifact glasses.

References

External links

 

Warehouse 13 episodes
2011 American television episodes
Television episodes directed by Constantine Makris